Chua Wee Hian (born 1939) is a Singaporean Evangelical, known for his longterm role as General Secretary of the International Fellowship of Evangelical Students from 1972 to 1991.

Biography 
Chua was educated at London Bible College and Fuller Theological Seminary. He held various positions in International Fellowship of Evangelical Students (IFES), as Associate General Secretary of East Asia and, from 1972 to 1991, serving as the organization's second General Secretary. After IFES, Chua served as senior pastor of Emmanuel Church in London from 1991 to 2008.

He is married to King Ling and they have three sons.

Works

References 

1939 births
Living people
Alumni of the London School of Theology
Fuller Theological Seminary alumni
Singaporean Christian clergy